"Big Apple" is a song written and performed by the British band Kajagoogoo. Released in September 1983, it was the first single to be taken from the band's second album Islands (1984), and their first song without lead singer Limahl, who had been fired from the band earlier that year. From this single onwards, lead vocals were performed by bassist Nick Beggs.

The song became the group's fourth Top 20 hit in the United Kingdom, peaking at number eight (though was less successful in the United States, where the band are still considered to be a one-hit wonder).

Track listings 
7" EMI 5423

 "Big Apple" – 4:12
 "Monochromatic" (Live) – 4:12

12" 12EMI 5423

 "Big Apple" (Metro Mix) – 6:08
 "Big Apple" (Single Version) – 4:15
 "Monochromatic" (Live) – 4:12

Charts

References

1983 singles
Kajagoogoo songs
Song recordings produced by Colin Thurston
1983 songs
Number-one singles in Iceland